Cameo Records was an American record label that flourished in the 1920s. It was owned by the Cameo Record Corporation in New York City.

Cameo released a disc by Lucille Hegamin every two months from 1921 to 1926. Cameo records are also noted for dance music. The catalogue also included the Original Memphis Five and the Varsity Eight. Musicians such as Red Nichols, Miff Mole, Adrian Rollini, and Frank Signorelli made trips to the Cameo studios. In 1926, Cameo started recording using a microphone-electrical process. An interesting blues number is 583, "Crazy Blues", by Salt & Pepper. Listen to the podcast at 26:46, where the disc is mentioned as an "early electric".

The Cameo Record Corporation started Lincoln Records (1924) and Romeo Records (1926). In 1928 it merged with Pathé Records, and then the American Record Corporation. The resulting company stopped using the Cameo name in the 1930s.

This label is not affiliated with Cameo-Parkway Records which was active in the 1950s and 1960s.

See also 
 List of record labels

References

External links
Cameo Records on the Internet Archive's Great 78 Project

American record labels
Record labels established in 1921
Record labels disestablished in 1930
Jazz record labels